Parkway Parade is a suburban shopping centre in Marine Parade, Singapore. Officially opened in March 1984, it has a 17-floor office tower and a seven-storey shopping mall with a basement. Developed by Parkway Holdings, the company sold the building to Asia Pacific Investment Company in 2000. The mall is managed by Lendlease.

History

The development of Parkway Parade began in March 1981. Developed by Parkway Holdings on a  plot along Marine Parade Road, the complex comprised a 15-storey office building and a six-storey shopping podium, and was expected to cost . The mall was designed after American suburban shopping centres, and Parkway Holdings sought advice from American and Australian consultants for its design. In order to meet an Urban Redevelopment Authority deadline, the building contractor, Kajima Corporation, used a proprietary flat-slab construction technique to construct the complex.

The complex opened in December 1983, and was well-patronised by shoppers, according to The Straits Times.

At the time of completion, Parkway Parade was one of the first suburban shopping malls in Singapore. It featured many major tenants setting up their stores in the suburbs for the first time, such as Isetan, Marks & Spencer, Best Denki (then known as Yaohan Best), children's department store Small World and MPH Bookstore. It also featured a wide array of food choices, including Chuck'E'Cheese (located inside Small World), Hardee's and Petite Park, and also had an mini theme park occupying Levels 3 and 4 (Funland), and a playground at Level 7, which was the first and largest mall playground in Singapore at that time. The mall was also home to the second Singapore outlet of Border's bookstore in 2007, together with Dôme Cafe sharing a portion of its floor space.

In 1992, Weekend East claimed that Parkway Parade was one of the most successful malls in Singapore, with 12 million visitors annually. In 2000, the property was sold to Asia Pacific Insurance Company, and subsequently Lendlease was appointed to manage the mall.

Makeover
The mall commenced its first makeover in March 2002 and was completed in two phases. The first phase included a new tenant mix, to reflect the positioning of the mall. This included anchor tenant, Giant, occupying nearly half of the third floor. The mall was fully renovated, with the second phase completed in November 2003, with an expanded food court by Food Republic at the Basement floor. It also included the completion of the 'Waterfall' leisure and dining precinct with one of the country's tallest glass waterfall, six food and beverage outdoor kiosks with an alfresco-dining area and a restaurant with an all-glass facade.

Further facelifts were done to mall's exterior featuring an expanded seating area for first floor restaurants in 2011, and repositioning of the mall's entrance area. Completed at the end of 2012, the new layout added around 10 new tenants to the expansion, which includes Din Tai Fung, Papparich and Twelve Cupcakes.

In 2015, a mix of retail shops was introduced to keep the mall updated. Best Denki, was relocated to Level 3, together with six rows of retail shops taking a part of the hypermarket space. A seven-screen Cathay Cineplex opened in September 2017, taking over the former True Fitness space at Level 7.

Giant ceased operations after an 18-year tenancy at Parkway Parade in February 2020, with FairPrice Xtra coming in as an anchor tenant that opened thereafter in 2021. Isetan has ceased operations in late January 2022 after 38 years in operation.

References

External links
 

1984 establishments in Singapore
Shopping malls in Singapore
Marine Parade